Sean Michael Leonard Anderson (born March 25, 1988), known professionally as Big Sean, is an American rapper. Anderson began his music career in 2007 and gained popularity in 2010 with his third mixtape Finally Famous Vol. 3: Big. He then signed a recording contract with GOOD Music and Def Jam Recordings and released his debut studio album, Finally Famous in 2011, which included the US top 10 single "Dance (Ass)" (featuring Nicki Minaj). Anderson followed it with his second album, Hall of Fame (2013), while his third album, Dark Sky Paradise (2015), debuted atop the US Billboard 200. It also included the hit singles "I Don't Fuck with You" (featuring E-40) and "Blessings" (featuring Drake). His fourth album, I Decided (2017), contained "Bounce Back", his highest-charting US single, while his fifth album Detroit 2 (2020) was his third consecutive platinum album.

Early life 
Sean Michael Leonard Anderson was born on March 25, 1988, in Santa Monica, California to Myra and James Anderson. When he was three months old, he moved to Detroit, Michigan, where he was raised by his mother, a school teacher, and his grandmother. Anderson's grandmother, Mildred Leonard, served in World War II, and was one of the first ever black female captains in the United States Army. He attended the Detroit Waldorf School and graduated from Cass Technical High School with a 3.7 GPA.

Musical career

2005–2006: Career beginnings
In his later years in high school, Sean showed his rhyming skills on a weekly basis as part of a rap battle contest held by Detroit hip-hop station WHTD. In 2005, Kanye West was doing a radio interview at 102.7 FM. Hearing about this, Sean headed over to the station to meet West and perform some freestyle. Initially West was reluctant to hear him, however, he gave Sean 16 bars to rap for him. According to Big Sean, West enjoyed his freestyle: "As we get to the entrance of the radio station ... we stopped in the middle of the doorway. He starts looking at me and bobbing his head." After the freestyle, Sean left West his demo tape. Two years later, West signed Big Sean to GOOD Music. Sean has cited West, Eminem, The Notorious B.I.G., and J Dilla as his influences.

2007–2010: Mixtapes and internet following

On September 30, 2007, Big Sean released his first official mixtape Finally Famous: The Mixtape. His hit single, "Get'cha Some", produced by WrighTrax, attained media attention and led to articles in The Source and the Detroit Metro Times. He also recorded a music video for "Get'cha Some", which was directed by Hype Williams. Sean released a second mixtape hosted by Mick Boogie on April 16, 2009, called UKNOWBIGSEAN. It featured the songs "Million Dollars", "Get'cha Some" and "Supa Dupa". This mixtape includes 30 tracks. Sean released a third mixtape hosted by Don Cannon on August 31, 2010, called Finally Famous Vol. 3: BIG, which features include major artists like Bun B, Chip tha Ripper, Curren$y, Tyga, Drake, Mike Posner, Chuck Inglish, Asher Roth, Dom Kennedy and Chiddy Bang. The mixtape includes 20 tracks.

An unauthorized leak of his collaboration with Drake, called "Made" made its way onto the internet on April 30, 2010. In an interview with TheHipHopUpdate.com on May 1, Big Sean expressed his disappointment over the leak, calling it an unfinished version both musically and lyrically. Big Sean's official Facebook page confirmed that his debut album Finally Famous & Consequence's Cons TV would be released on September 14, 2010. On August 31, Big Sean tweeted that the album was not coming out on that day, but that it would be coming out sometime in 2011.

2011–2012: Finally Famous and Detroit
In an interview on Conspiracy Worldwide Radio, Sean discussed the role Kanye West and No I.D. have had in the development of his first studio album's sonic direction as well as the challenges of being inside the studio with West. The album's lead single, "My Last", features vocals from Chris Brown and was produced by No I.D. According to Amazon.com, Big Sean's Finally Famous was delayed by a week, with a tentative release date set for June 28. Big Sean revealed the cover art for his G.O.O.D. Music debut and explained that the one-week pushback was to be blamed on sample and feature clearance issues. The official tracklist was revealed on June 7.

Finally Famous, Sean's debut studio album, was released June 28, 2011, and spawned three hit singles; "My Last", "Marvin & Chardonnay" and "Dance (Ass)". The album featured guest appearances from Lupe Fiasco, John Legend, Pharrell, Kanye West, Roscoe Dash, Wiz Khalifa, Chiddy Bang, Rick Ross, Nicki Minaj, Pusha T, and included production from No I.D., The Legendary Traxster, Andrew "Pop" Wansel, Xaphoon Jones and The Neptunes. When the songs "O.T.T.R." and "Flowers" were leaked in July 2011, speculation began of a new mixtape. Sean confirmed in an interview June 28, 2011, that a collaborative mixtape between him and "two other guys in hip-hop that are just killing it right now" will be released "in a couple of weeks". Wiz Khalifa and Curren$y, were the suspected featured rappers on the mixtape. However, Wiz Khalifa later confirmed that there would be no mixtape, claiming that the songs were created, "just for fun".

In July 2011, Big Sean contributed two rap verses to Kelly Rowland's single Lay It on Me, from her Here I Am album. Big Sean collaborated with Hit-Boy in writing and producing the song.

In September 2011, Big Sean confirmed in an interview with the Daily Tribune that he'll be working on his second album during the I Am Finally Famous Tour and plans to release the album sometime in 2012. On October 19, 2011, Kanye West announced on his Twitter plans for a Spring 2012 GOOD Music album release. On April 6, 2012, "Mercy", the lead single from the GOOD Music compilation album, Cruel Summer, was released. The song, produced by newly signed in-house producer Lifted, features Big Sean along with Kanye West, Pusha T and southern rapper 2 Chainz. Big Sean then announced his fourth mixtape would be titled "Detroit" and would serve as a lead-in to his second studio album. He then began promoting the mixtape, releasing short versions of the songs on his YouTube page. On September 5, 2012, Big Sean released the mixtape Detroit which features guest appearances from fellow rappers J. Cole, Juicy J, King Chip, French Montana, Royce da 5'9", Kendrick Lamar and Tyga.

2013–2015: Hall of Fame and Dark Sky Paradise
Big Sean pushed back the release date of his second studio album Hall of Fame, and was eventually released on August 27, 2013. The album has skits to give it a "classic feel", and includes features from multiple artists, including Lil Wayne, Miguel, and Nas. The album's production was primarily handled by No I.D., and Key Wane along with additional production from Hit-Boy, and Da Internz, Mike Dean, Travis Scott, Xaphoon Jones and Young Chop among others. Big Sean also stated in an interview that he was in the studio with fellow Detroit native Eminem. Sean went on to say they made a "Detroit classic" but he is unsure if it will be on Hall of Fame because of "timing issues". Hall of Fame had spawned five singles, "Guap", "Switch Up" featuring Common, "Beware" featuring Jhené Aiko and Lil Wayne, "Fire", and "Ashley" featuring Miguel.

A month prior to the release of Hall of Fame, Big Sean told Complex that he had already begun work on his third album due to the inspiration from his new relationship. On September 12, 2014, Big Sean announced that he had signed a management deal with Roc Nation. Later that same day he released four new songs titled, "I Don't Fuck with You", "Paradise", "4th Quarter" and "Jit/Juke". Producers for these songs include, Mike Will Made It, DJ Mustard, Kanye West, DJ Dahi, Nate Fox, Da Internz, L&F, and Key Wane. "I Don't Fuck with You" was released to iTunes on September 19, 2014. In an interview with Sway Calloway, Sean confirmed that Lil Wayne will be featured on the album.

On January 25, 2015, various artists who worked on Big Sean's upcoming third studio album such as Kanye West, Ty Dolla Sign, DJ Mustard, Drake, Travis Scott and Ariana Grande posted the album cover to Twitter or Instagram. The next day, Big Sean posted a trailer to his new album which revealed the album's release date as February 24, 2015. The album, Dark Sky Paradise debuted atop the Billboard 200 making it his first No. 1 album. He would lead with Video singles for songs entitled "IDFWU", "Blessings", "I Know", "One Man Can Change The World", and "Play No Games." As of February 1, 2016, Dark Sky Paradise was certified platinum. On December 31, 2015, Big Sean released a track recapping 2015, "What A Year (Ft. Pharrell Williams & Detail)".

2016–2018: Twenty88, I Decided., and Double or Nothing
On March 25, 2016, Big Sean released a track to celebrate his 28th birthday, "Get My Shit Together". Two days later he announced a self-titled album with Jhené Aiko, as Twenty88, scheduled to be released on April 1, 2016, exclusively on Tidal. The album was released on April 5, 2016, on Apple Music and Spotify. A week after the exclusive release of Twenty88 on Tidal, Big Sean and Aiko released a 15-minute short film called Out of Love, which is composed of several recordings from the album. Around the same month, upon the wake of the Flint water crisis, Big Sean tweeted to the city's official Twitter account, asking if he could do anything to help, and later on donated $10,000.

On October 31, 2016, Big Sean released "Bounce Back" as the lead single from his fourth studio album, I Decided, which was released February 3, 2017. "Moves" was released as an instant-great on December 16, 2016. Sean consulted the advice of Jay Z and Rick Rubin while working on the album. Big Sean achieved his second number one album on the Billboard 200 chart, as I Decided debuted at the top. It earned 151,000 equivalent album units in the week of February 9, according to Nielsen Music. 65,000 of the amount were in pure album sales. As of April 18, 2017, I Decided was certified gold.

Two months after the release of I Decided, Big Sean was offered the official Key to the City of Detroit for his contribution to his own Sean Anderson foundation.

On November 3, 2017, Sean and Metro Boomin released the single "Pull Up N Wreck", featuring 21 Savage. A month later, it was announced that Sean and Metro were to release a collaborative album titled Double or Nothing. The album was released on December 8, 2017, which included features from Travis Scott, 2 Chainz, 21 Savage, Kash Doll, Young Thug, and Swae Lee,
and included the single "Pull Up N Wreck".

In 2017, Big Sean voiced the character of Terrence for an episode of HBO's animated series Animals.

2019–present: Detroit 2

On July 24, 2019, Big Sean released his first solo single since 2017 titled "Overtime", produced by Hit-Boy, Key Wane, and the Tucker Brothers. In an interview with Beats 1 Radio, Sean said he was "returning to his roots" with the single ahead of his forthcoming album. On July 26, he released the song "Single Again", which includes background vocals from Jhené Aiko and Ty Dolla Sign. On August 26, he released the single "Bezerk" featuring ASAP Ferg, performing it at the 2019 MTV Video Music Awards.

On March 25 (Big Sean's 32nd birthday), he announced that his new record would be titled Detroit 2. On August 25, he released the album's lead single, "Deep Reverence", featuring late rapper Nipsey Hussle.

Later on in the year, Big Sean starred in the animated movie Trouble (also known as Dog Gone Trouble), alongside Pamela Adlon and Lucy Hale. The movie was directed by Kevin Johnson.

Detroit 2 was released on September 4, 2020, and features collaborations with Eminem, Jhené Aiko, and Lil Wayne. The album debuted at number one on the Billboard 200, marking his third number-one album.

On September 17, 2020, Big Sean revealed in a Reddit AMA that another Twenty88 album is "in the works". A track attributed to the project appeared on Detroit 2. He has also announced that he plans on launching his own record label. On October 29, 2021, Big Sean announced on Twitter that after 14 years, he has stepped away from Kanye West's G.O.O.D. Music label, saying "That's a forever brotherhood, but business wise, I had to start getting a bigger cut! I worked my way out that deal." West also claimed during a November 2021 Drink Champs podcast that signing Sean was the 'worst decision' of his entire career.

Starting in 2020, Big Sean has appeared in the Showtime series Twenties in a recurring role as Trsitan, an anti-social media character who learns the value of online connection.

In October 2021, Big Sean, in collaboration with rapper and producer Hit-Boy released an EP entitled What You Expect.

In February 2022, Big Sean and singer Queen Naija released a single entitled Hate Our Love. The song will appear of Naija's upcoming album. In that same month, Big Sean confirmed the Twenty88 album and revealed he was collaborating with girlfriend Jhené Aiko.

In September 2022, Big Sean re-released Detroit to streaming platforms, in honor of its 10th anniversary.

Personal life
Big Sean dated his high school sweetheart, Ashley Marie, whom he met when he was sixteen and started dating at nineteen until their break-up in early 2013. He subsequently began dating actress Naya Rivera, whom he first met on Twitter; their relationship became public in April 2013. Sean and Rivera were engaged from October 2013 to April 2014. He dated singer Ariana Grande from October 2014 to April 2015. 

Big Sean has been in a relationship with singer Jhené Aiko since 2016. In his 2020 song "Deep Reverence", he revealed that Aiko had previously experienced a miscarriage. Their son was born on November 8, 2022.

On November 28, 2017, Big Sean purchased an 11,000 square foot home, with 7 bedrooms and 8 bathrooms home in Beverly Hills. The house was previously owned by Guns N' Roses guitarist Slash. Originally listed at $11 million, Big Sean acquired it for $8.7 million.

Big Sean has struggled with depression, canceling a tour in 2018. He credits therapy, a healthy lifestyle, exercise and taking a break from touring to refocus on his music as instrumental in his recovery.

Sean Anderson Foundation 
In May 2012, Big Sean founded a nonprofit organization called the “Sean Anderson Foundation,” with the aim of helping underserved children and families in his native Detroit. Alongside direct donations to local institutions, primarily educational institutions, the foundation has created fundraising programs and partnered with other organizations. In 2016, the foundation launched #HealFlintKids to raise money for the Community Foundation of Greater Flint amid the Flint water crisis - the program raised $100,000.

In 2015, the foundation launched Mogul Prep, which partnered high school students with music industry professionals. During the same year, the foundation donated a recording studio for students at Big Sean's alma mater, Cass Technical High School.

Beginning in 2018, the foundation has hosted an annual weekend festival, called D.O.N. Weekend, with free events and performances for Detroit residents and usually by Detroit artists. In December 2018, Big Sean in partnership with Ally Financial, Thurgood Marshall College Fund & the Sean Anderson Foundation, created an annual scholarship competition for HBCU students called “Moguls in the Making.”

In 2019, the foundation partnered with Boys & Girls Club of Southeastern Michigan, donating a second $100,000 recording studio to the club during that year's D.O.N. Weekend.

Since 2012, the foundation has participated in the annual All Star Giveback on Thanksgiving, where it distributes turkeys, trimming and canned goods to Detroit residents.

In May 2021, Big Sean, via his Sean Anderson foundation, released a video series on wellness and mental health. The series was released during Mental Health Awareness Month and featured conversation between Big Sean and his mother, educator Myra Anderson, about the intersection between wellness and mental health, including topics like meditation, sleep and emotional freedom techniques.

Other ventures 
In October 2008, Big Sean was featured in The Source and headlined the "Style" section of the magazine. He posed in the Winter 2008 Billionaire Boys Club lookbook, and is a consistent representative of Ti$A apparel. He has an endorsement deal with Adidas, through which he has released his own "Detroit Player" line of sneakers, and is a follower of the Rosewood clothing style. 

In 2013, Big Sean launched his own clothing company, Aura Gold.

In 2018, Big Sean launched a shoe collection with PUMA, called Puma x Big Sean. The collection included a relaunch of the classic PUMA Suede, released on the shoe's 50th anniversary. In December 2020, Big Sean joined the NBA's Detroit Pistons as creative director of innovation. In that role, he leads the design of team apparel, with practice jerseys bearing his “Don Life” logo, and other non-game, community-driven initiatives. 

In December 2020, Big Sean joined McDonald's “Black & Positively Golden” mentorship program. The program offers scholarships for HBCU students.

Legal issues 
On August 4, 2011, Big Sean was arrested for third-degree sexual assault at a concert in Lewiston, New York. On October 26, he pleaded guilty to second-degree unlawful imprisonment, and was fined $750; the charges of third-degree sexual abuse were dropped as part of the plea bargain. Big Sean's attorney, Scott Leemon, stated that Sean "regrets any misunderstandings that occurred that day and reiterates he did not engage in any type of sexual misconduct."

Discography

Studio albums

 Finally Famous (2011)
 Hall of Fame (2013)
 Dark Sky Paradise (2015)
 I Decided (2017)
 Detroit 2 (2020)

Collaborative albums
 Twenty88  (2016)
 Double or Nothing  (2017)

Filmography

Tours
Headlining
 I Am Finally Famous Tour (2011)
 Detroit Tour (2013)
 Hall of Fame Tour (2014)
 I Decided Tour (2017)

Supporting act
 J. Cole – Forest Hills Drive Tour (2015)
 Rihanna – Anti World Tour (2016)

See also
List of awards and nominations received by Big Sean

References

External links
 

1988 births
Living people
African-American male rappers
Cass Technical High School alumni
Def Jam Recordings artists
GOOD Music artists
Musicians from Santa Monica, California
Rappers from Detroit
Midwest hip hop musicians
Rappers from Los Angeles
Songwriters from California
Songwriters from Michigan
Waldorf school alumni
21st-century American rappers
African-American songwriters
Pop rappers